Joubert Lum Davenport (June 26, 1900 – April 21, 1961) was a Major League Baseball pitcher. He played parts of four seasons in the majors, from  until , for the Chicago White Sox.

Sources

Major League Baseball pitchers
Chicago White Sox players
Beaumont Exporters players
Minneapolis Millers (baseball) players
Shreveport Sports players
Baltimore Orioles (IL) players
Omaha Buffaloes players
Amarillo Texans players
Baseball players from Tucson, Arizona
1900 births
1961 deaths